Rivergate Mall is a super-regional shopping mall located in Goodlettsville, Tennessee, United States, just outside of Nashville, the state capital of Tennessee. Opened in October 1971, the mall features  of gross leasable area, with approximately 80 stores and restaurants, as well as a food court. Its original anchor stores were Cain-Sloan, Castner Knott, and JCPenney. Rivergate Mall has two anchor stores: Dillard's and JCPenney. There are two vacant anchor stores that were formerly Macy's and Sears. The mall sits in the core of a shopping district that is shared by the city of Goodlettsville and the Nashville neighborhood of Madison. This area is colloquially referred to by locals as "Rivergate," after the mall. Rivergate Mall is managed by Hendon Properties.

History

1970s to 1980s

Rivergate Mall was built by Retail Planning Corporation, an Atlanta-based mall developer, just outside the state capital of Nashville, Tennessee within Goodletsville along Two Mile Pike. The mall officially opened on October 6, 1971. Upon its opening, Rivergate Mall became the largest mall in Tennessee, a title it would hold until the opening of Hickory Hollow Mall in 1978. The mall originally included three anchor stores: Cain-Sloan, Castner Knott, and JCPenney. Other major tenants at opening included Jo-Ann Fabrics, McCrory, and Walgreens. Journeys opened their first location in the mall in December 1986. Cain-Sloan sold its store to Dillard's in 1987, as a part of deal which included the sale of three Nashville-area locations. A wing featuring Sears, dozens of new parcels, and a food court was added in 1989.

1990s to 2000s
During a tornado outbreak on May 18, 1995, part of the Rivergate Mall's roof collapsed, injuring more than a dozen people. The mall was sold to CBL Associates & Properties for $247 million in June 1998. In August of that year, Proffitt's purchased five Nashville-area locations from Castner Knott, including their Rivergate Mall store. With the threat of competition from nearby Opry Mills, CBL renovated the mall in 1999, adding new carpeting and a new entranceway. Proffitt's sold its store to Hecht's in March 2001 as part of a deal to sell off nine locations. Linens 'n Things opened a store at the mall in 2003. Macy's moved into the mall in 2006, replacing Hecht's after it sold its five Nashville-area locations to the company. By 2008, the Streets of Indian Lake was nearing completion in nearby Hendersonville, attracting many upscale retailers, causing a decline in shoppers at the mall. Incredible Dave's, a restaurant and entertainment center, replaced a mall wing in 2012, but closed in 2014.

2010s to present
In 2013, CBL sold three of their malls, including the Rivergate Mall, to an offshore investor for $176 million. The new owner leased the malls to Atlanta-based Hendon Properties. An 11,695-square-foot Guitar Center opened in the mall in the spring of 2017, while existing tenant, teen apparel retailer rue21, opened a larger store with an additional  in the summer of 2017. Another existing tenant, shoe retailer Foot Locker, added a new store with an additional  in the fall of 2017. Sears closed its store at the mall in March 2019 as part of a plan to close 80 locations nationwide. Following the closure of Macy's in 2020, the anchor store's space was sold to Urban Story Ventures for $4 million, however the group did not announce any redevelopment plans for the space.

References

External links
Rivergate Mall Official web site

Shopping malls established in 1971
Shopping malls in Tennessee
Buildings and structures in Davidson County, Tennessee
Tourist attractions in Davidson County, Tennessee
1971 establishments in Tennessee